Lalpa Kohhran Thar is a millennialist Christian sect and dissenters of the Presbyterian Church in Mizoram, India. Started by a World War I veteran Khuangtuaha in 1942, it flourishes in Serchhip district. Originally from Hmawngkawn village, the followers resettled at the fringe of Baktawng village, the locality now called Tlangnuam. Sometimes referred to as the Mormons of Mizoram, they are recognised for practising polygamy and at one time housing the single biggest family in the world. As of 2021, the adherents have spread to various parts of Mizoram pursuing different professions, and are estimated to number over 2,000 followers in 433 families.

As the most popular leader of the sect, Ziona (1945–2021) was globally renowned for fathering a single largest family in the world, with 39 wives, 94 children and 33 grandchildren and one great-grandchild at the time of his death. He was chosen in 2007 for entry as the biggest family in the Guinness World Records, but he declined to avoid publicity. His family is eventually listed as the "Biggest Family" in the world in 2011 by the World Record Academy, and The Wall Street Journal in 2011, and then by the London World Records in 2019. He was also featured in Ripley's Believe It or Not! top 11 strangest stories for the year 2011, and in 2013's Ripley Believe It or Not book 9.

Origin and history

Khuangtuaha Pawl 
Lalpa Kohhran Thar was started by Khuangtuaha (full name Khuangtuahthanga). Khuangtuah was born in 1891 at Sialsuk village, and was the second child of eight siblings, four brothers and four sisters. He fought in the Abor War of 1912 and then in World War I as a volunteer in the British Army. He received two war medals for his service in France. A spiritual enlightenment in 1935 prompted him to devote his life in evangelism. He established followers at Hmawngkawn village, where he allegedly had an apparition of three strangers who told him that he was destined to be one of the three stars and instructed him of new religious practices. He was the first to adopt a kind of spiritual sex called khurbing by which men and women form illicit extramarital couples. As a previously Mizo traditional drummer, he also advocated the use of khuang (Mizo traditional drum) for worship purposes. The British missionaries perceived the Mizo traditional drum deeply rooted in and associated with pagan rituals, and denounced the use as an instrument of worship. He also reintroduced the use of Mizo wine, which was also proscribed by the church. His followers then began to be known as Khuangtuaha Pawl ("Pawl" means group or sect or organisation). The original members were about 30 in number.

Upon these subversive practices, the Presbyterian Church officially condemned the group as dissenters for upholding liberal, "wrong and dangerous" theology and excommunicated them in 1942. Another factor leading to the excommunication was the birth of Khuangtuaha's illegitimate child. Supported by his brother Chana (full name Challianchana), Khuangtuaha formally established a new sect on 12 June 1942. His followers settled with him in a localised area on the outskirts of the village. The sect still celebrate the foundation date as "Bawkte Kut" (literally meaning "Festival of the Hut" referring to the initial settlement) every year. For inciting immoral social life, the British soldiers imprisoned him for three months in 1942, and again for nine months in 1943.

A popular account that he and his sect were evicted from Hmawngkawn by the village chief, with the support from British officers, is not true. Followers joined him and settled at Hmawngkawn from different parts of Mizoram. To the dismay of his followers who revered him as an immortal prophet or a demi-god, he died in 1955. He is interred at Hmawngkawn cemetery, where the inscription on his tombstone reads:Kan pa hmangaih ram hruaitu Khuangtuahthanga Mizoram hmingthang berte zinga mi chu March 30, 1955-ah Lalpa hnenah a chawl ta. Kum 64. Chhakchhuak. [Our father and beloved leader Khuangtuahthanga one of the most famous people in Mizoram died on 30 March 1955 to rest with the Lord. Age 64. Chhakchhuak (name of the clan).]There are two memorial stones erected in Hmawngkawn, one of which bears the headline inscription:Kan pa nunhlun zirna sikul hawngtu hmasa ber Khuangtuahthanga chu March 30, 1955-ah Lalpa hnenah a chawl ta. [Our father who opened the first school of everlasting life Khuangtuahthanga rests with the Lord on 30 March 1955.]The sect observes the date as a holy day in place of Good Friday.

Chana Pawl 
Khuangtuaha was succeeded by his younger brother Chana. (Some reports indicating Khuangtuaha as father of Chana are false.) Born in 1910, Chana was more modernised and educated up to secondary education. Against the advice of his father, Thlohva, who clung to Mizo paganism, not to follow his brother Khuangtuaha, he converted to Christianity and later joined his brother. He married seven wives and that started the practice of polygamy in the sect. Khuangtuaha also followed suit and had three wives by the time he died. Unlike his brother, Chana did not forsake materialism and embraced allopathic medicine such as use of pharmaceutical medications. He was known to foretell important political events including disbandment of Mizo tribal chieftainship by the government, departure of British missionaries, Independence of India and the rise and fall of Hitler. He also introduced a proper worship place called Inpui (mansion or temple), a complex of his quarters, church and community hall, constructed in 1956. With his revolutionised leadership, the sect became popularly known as Chana Pawl.

Migration and resettlement 
In 1966, Mizoram faced a social and political turbulence following the Mizo National Front uprising that struggled for independence from India. In 1967, the Government of India exercised village conglomeration policy for effective administration under the insurgency. Under the political strategy named Protected and Progressive Villages (PPVs), small villages were forced to merge into bigger villages which were easily accessible for transportations and communications. For Hmawngkawn, the nearest grouping centre was Baktawng, 50 km from Hmawngkawn, and Chana's sect was allowed to relocated at the western fringe of the village. They were 20 families and started from scratch in a dense forest. They gave the new habitation a name Tlangnuam ("Serene Hill").

Due to severe hardship during resettlement, some followers were discouraged and inclined to renounce their faith. The sect faced a severe bottleneck survival. But a materialistic-oriented Chana was a hardworking man, and soon developed various professional trades for the church members. With focussed division of labour, families were motivated to take up manual jobs of their interest; they became specialised in farming, carpentry and tinsmith. By the time Mizoram was given an inclusive administrative system as Union Territory in 1972, political and economic lives were rehabilitated. Chana's community became a self-sustaining "industrial colony," and a formidable social and political force as they managed to get majority of votes in government elections, especially in those of village council.

Official name 
The sect by then were known by different names such as Khuangtuaha Pawl, Khurbing and Chana Pawl. As they became a consolidated community without any officially approved recognition, Darhmingliana, the Administrative Officer of Baktawng, suggested them the name Lalpa Kohhran Thar. In 1971, the sect approved the new name.

Ziona and Chhuanthar 
As Chana died on 27 February 1997, his eldest son Ziona became an elected successor. Ziona was born on 21 July 1945 as Zionthanga. Popularly known among the Mizo natives as Pu Ziona, he is often misnamed in the non-native media as Ziona Chana. The sect called him by the honorific title "Hotupa" (literally meaning leader or master). He became the most prolific polygamous man of the sect. He married his first wife Zaṭhiangi, who was three years his senior, at the age of 17; and the last in 2004. By the time he took up the leadership, he already had more wives than his father. He married ten of his wives in the span of one year. It is not known exactly how many wives he had had in his lifetime. By 2005, three were dead and some abandoned him. At the time of his death in 2021, he had 38 wives, 89 children and 33 grandchildren.

Social revival 
Ziona set up a different system of communal living from his predecessors. He constructed separate church and residence. The church is named Hnam Thlan Run Pui ("Mansion of the Chosen People"). His massive four-storied house called Chhuanthar Run (CTR, meaning "Abode of the New Generation") enclosed more than 100 rooms for 200 inhabitants of Ziona's direct family. Ziona had a double bedroom in the ground floor of this mansion and his wives took turns to sleep with him according to a roster. His younger wives stayed close to his room on the same floor and there were always seven to eight wives attending to his needs during the day. All older wives live in the dormitories on the first floor of the mansion, while the younger wives live on the ground floor. His community became a major tourist attraction in Mizoram. To receive visitors, he constructed a separate guesthouse named Khualbuk.

Ziona's personality and social organisation attracted many people and he was joined by many new followers, with a total of about 3,000 members in the sect, in 350 families. About 300 families live in Tlangnuam itself. In one of the most pivotal and moral revolutions of the sect, Ziona prohibited illicit extramarital sex. Since his father, the sect leader did not intervene in marriage proceedings, which are solely decided and organised by the elected priests.

Ziona introduced formal education. During his lifetime, the community has government recognised schools up to higher secondary education, all named Chhuanthar. He ensured that all children have education. He also introduced sport facilities for the children. There is a football field-sized ground called Chhuanthar Stadium. The stadium is used for all sports and mass gatherings. For festivals and official programmes, Ziona introduced a military-like system for all members. They have properly ranked uniforms and duties including mass parades.

The work culture started by Chana and fostered by Ziona made the sect one of the most industrious communities in Mizoram. They are recognised and supported by the state government, and the Governor and Chief Ministers of Mizoram in persons. As his family said, not a day (other than religious days) would pass without Ziona working from morning to evening. One advantage of having one big family is an efficient workforce. Even when other families are in need of help, Ziona would deploy his workforce freely for assistance.

Ziona also developed a liberal world view. In contrast to his predecessors, who largely lived in seclusion from neighbouring communities and government establishments, Ziona allowed members to participate in the various social organisations of the Mizo people, and cast vote independently in government elections. The community is part (an official branch) of the Young Mizo Association, the largest non-governmental organisation in Mizoram. Women are also members of the Mizoram Hmeichhe Insuihkhawm Pawl, the biggest women's organisation among the Mizo people. The government had also constructed MHIP building for them.

Ziona instituted a community service day. On every Monday, no one is allowed to run their own errands. The elders draw schedules for each individual to perform community work of their ability. Routine works include cleaning streets, repairing roads, repairing of someone else's house, caring for someone else's farm, and helping families in need of workforce. The monthly tithe (contribution of one-tenth of their earnings) is utilised mainly for this day. Even the children have to do sweeping streets in the morning before they attend their schools.

World record 
By 2005, with 15 wives and more than 100 children, Ziona could have been eligible for as heading the biggest family in the Guinness World Records. In 2007, he was formally proposed for entry into the Guinness, but as the officials visited him for verification and documentary evidences, he refused to have his photograph taken. In 2011, he explained to a CNN reporter, the reason he declined the record was that "he doesn't want the publicity." Still, he is known as the Guinness world record holder for having the biggest family, even in government sources. But Guinness has no record for biggest/largest human family.

Ziona's family is recorded by the World Record Academy as setting the world record for the "Biggest Family". At the time of the record entry in 2011, Ziona had 39 wives, 94 children, 14-daughters-in-laws and 33 grandchildren. The same year, The Wall Street Journal listed the family as "The Biggest Family in the World". Ziona was listed as "head of the world's biggest family" in the London World Records in 2019.

In 2011, Ripley's Believe It or Not!, while recording Ziona's family as the largest living family in the world, observed: "It's a safe bet that Ziona Chana would not be impressed watching 19 Kids and Counting or Sister Wives. The 75-year-old Indian man had 39 wives, 94 children and 33 grandchildren and 1 great grandchild." Ziona and his family was included in 2013's Ripley Believe It or Not book 9.

Beliefs and practices 
The central theological theme of Lalpa Kohhran Thar is millennialism. As conceived by Khuangtuaha, they are chosen to be part of the thousand-year-reign of Jesus Christ, the concept known to them as Kum Sang Rorel. They believe in the literal event of the Bible's Revelation Chapter 20, expecting Jesus to rule in this world.

Lalpa Kohhran Thar is judged by other Christian denominations as having elements hardly of Christianity. But the members claim that they are fully Christians and are not much different from other denominations. As their public spokesman C. Lalrinthanga explained, "Where we differ is putting into practice what the Gospel tells us, like charity, hard work, honesty, helping thy neighbours, simplicity and equality. We also have a very strong Mizo influence in everything we do, unlike other churches where Mizo cultural practices have made way for Western-style rituals."

Football tournaments are organised twice in a year. The first held in February is to commemorate the dead members calling the event as Pindan Lehlamte Hun Chan (literally "Time for Next Door People"), and the next in December called Thilsiamte Hun Chan ("For Nature") is specifically for awareness for nature conservation.

Polygamy 
Polygamy is the most outstanding practice of Lalpa Kohhran Thar. Khuangtuaha had decreed that a man may marry as many wives as he can support. Members believe this practice as "divinely ordained." The practice was started by Chana, who married seven wives while living at their original settlement in Hmawngkawn. Ziona gave the explanation as: "I believe God has chosen us to be like this [to have big families]... I never wanted to get married but that's the path God has chosen for me. It's not my wish to keep marrying again and again." Ziona's marriages were seen in the family as an act of chivalry as his wives either were from a poor family or orphans. The senior wives welcome the newcomers and there are never rivalries between them. His eldest son Nunparliana said in the New York Post, "Most of the women whom my father married were poor and orphan women of this village. By marrying them, he has set an example in the history of mankind."

However, polygamy is not an imposition and men are not entirely free to choose such marriages or their wives; they have to be approved by the priests. Only few elite and affluent members are eligible for having or would afford multiple wives. As Ziona's grandson Hmingthanzauva explained, saying, "My grandfather is specially appointed by God to have as many wives as possible and to look after them. But for me, having one wife and one son is quite enough. There is no rule or tradition as such that we have to follow polygamy, for me it's actually unbearable."

Festivals and ceremonies 
Lalpa Kohhran Thar observes traditional Christian festivals such as Christmas and New Year. But they discard Good Friday and replaced it with the death anniversary of Khuangtuaha on 30 March. The foundation day of the sect is observed on 12 June as a festival named "Bawkte Kut".

Ziona's birthday is celebrated on 21 July with all-day activities including church service, parading, and choral performances. The day concludes with a feast. They normally celebrate the occasion for two days, the second day being entirely mass dancing called khuallampui.

Community life 
The community life of Lalpa Kohhran Thar is described as "a blend of democracy and communism." Members are free to choose their profession, education, and public services including voting in government elections. Most of them are artisans and are acclaimed for being industrious and hardworking. Some are well educated and hold important government services. As a prominent example, C. Larinthanga, who joined the sect in 2007 and holds the responsibility of public relations is a bank officer under the Government of Mizoram. Some have become medical doctors, engineers, bureaucrats, school teachers, and armed forces. All families give monthly tithe which are used for various developmental activities of the church and welfare of the members. Nunparliana had proudly remarked: "There's no poverty here because we share everything."

Their work culture and productivity are more familiar to most Mizo people than their religious practices. One of their most popular products is a cooking pot popularly known as "Mizo cooker" along with other aluminium utensils. Every family has either carpentry or tinsmith workshop, and their products are also exported to neighbouring regions. Carpentry is one of their major achievements through ages, and about 70% of the families are entirely dependent on it. Their products such as doors and window frames are available in the cities. Door panels are their major product accounting for 23% of their carpentry output.

In 2020, the Small Industries Development Bank of India recognised the achievement by providing Cluster Development Programme on Carpentry. They received INR 50000000 (~USD6.7 million) for the project. In 2012, following several fires in different parts Mizoram making many families homeless, they donated Mizo cookers and window frames to the victim families. The Mizoram Science, Technology and Innovative Council, under the Directorate of Science and Technology, Government of Mizoram, provides a project for sawdust processing and charcoal manufacture since 2021.

Many families are agricultural farmers, and their products are appreciated by the state government. In 2013, the government declared and awarded Tlangnuam as the "Best Village" in Mizoram for successful farmings under the New Land Use Policy. The main achievement for the award was cultivation and crafting of brooms. In 2014, the government funded them for mass cultivation of aloe vera for soap industry. The soap industry was created using the funds from the National Mission on Medicinal Plants under the National Medicinal Plants Board, Government of India. In 2014, they were featured alongside Bollywood actress Sakshi Tanwar for a television promotional advertisement of soap.

In Serchhip district elections, the sect become a formidable voting community. They tend to vote for a particular candidate or party in unison despite Ziona's permission to exercise individual's voting rights and support political party of their choice. For this reason, they became the main centre of attention for candidates. Ziona's family alone can make decisive votes, as one of his wives Rinkimi proudly said, "When we go to vote, we always cast our ballots for the same candidate or party. That means more than 160-odd votes are assured from one family."

References 

Christianity in Mizoram
Polygamy
Religious identity